In monetary economics, the quantity theory of money (often abbreviated QTM) is one of the directions of Western economic thought that emerged in the 16th-17th centuries. The QTM states that the general price level of goods and services is directly proportional to the amount of money in circulation, or money supply. For example, if the amount of money in an economy doubles, QTM predicts that price levels will also double. The theory was originally formulated by Renaissance mathematician Nicolaus Copernicus in 1517, and was influentially restated by philosophers John Locke, David Hume and Jean Bodin. The theory experienced a large surge in popularity with economists Anna Schwartz and Milton Friedman's book A Monetary History of the United States, published in 1963.

The theory was challenged by Keynesian economists, but updated and reinvigorated by the monetarist school of economics, led by economist Milton Friedman. Critics of the theory argue that money velocity is not stable and, in the short-run, prices are sticky, so the direct relationship between money supply and price level does not hold.

Alternative theories include the real bills doctrine and the more recent fiscal theory of the price level.

Origins and development
The quantity theory descends from Nicolaus Copernicus, followers of the School of Salamanca like Martín de Azpilicueta, Jean Bodin, Henry Thornton, and various others who noted the increase in prices following the import of gold and silver, used in the coinage of money, from the New World. The "equation of exchange" relating the supply of money to the value of money transactions was stated by John Stuart Mill who expanded on the ideas of David Hume.  The quantity theory was developed by Simon Newcomb, Alfred de Foville, Irving Fisher, and Ludwig von Mises, although the latter believed demand for money was also a significant factor, in the late 19th and early 20th century.

Henry Thornton introduced the idea of a central bank after the financial panic of 1793. The concept of a modern central bank was, however, not given much attention until Keynes published A Tract on Monetary Reform in 1923. In 1802, Thornton published An Enquiry into the Nature and Effects of the Paper Credit of Great Britain in which he gave an account of his theory regarding the central bank's ability to control price level. According to his theory, it could control the currency in circulation through bookkeeping. This control could then allow it command of the money supply of the country. That ultimately would lead to central banks' ability to control price levels. Thornton's work was a major contribution to the quantity theory of money.

Karl Marx modified it by arguing that the labor theory of value requires that prices, under equilibrium conditions, are determined by socially necessary labor time needed to produce the commodity and that quantity of money was a function of the quantity of commodities, the prices of commodities, and the velocity. Marx did not reject the basic concept of the Quantity Theory of Money, but rejected the notion that each of the four elements were equal, and instead argued that the quantity of commodities and the price of commodities are the determinative elements and that the volume of money follows from them.  He argued... 

John Maynard Keynes, like Marx, accepted the theory in general and wrote...   Also like Marx he believed that the theory was misrepresented. Where Marx argues that the amount of money in circulation is determined by the quantity of goods times the prices of goods Keynes argued the amount of money was determined by the purchasing power or aggregate demand.  He wrote  In the Tract on Monetary Reform (1923), Keynes developed his own quantity equation: n = p(k + rk'),where n is the number of "currency notes or other forms of cash in circulation with the public", p is "the index number of the cost of living", and r is "the proportion of the bank's potential liabilities (k') held in the form of cash." Keynes also assumes "...the public,(k') including the business world, finds it convenient to keep the equivalent of k consumption in cash and of a further available k' at their banks against cheques..."  So long as k, k', and r do not change, changes in n cause proportional changes in p.

Keynes however notes...{{Quotation|The error often made by careless adherents of the Quantity Theory, which may partly explain why it is not universally accepted is as follows...  the Theory has often been expounded on the further assumption that a mere change in the quantity of the currency cannot affect k, r, and k&apos;, – that is to say, in mathematical parlance, that n is an independent variable in relation to these quantities. It would follow from this that an arbitrary doubling of n, since this in itself is assumed not to affect k, r, and k, must have the effect of raising p to double what it would have been otherwise. The Quantity Theory is often stated in this, or a similar, form.

Now "in the long run" this is probably true. If, after the American Civil War, that American dollar had been stabilized and defined by law at 10 per cent below its present value, it would be safe to assume that n and p would now be just 10 per cent greater than they actually are and that the present values of k, r, and k''' would be entirely unaffected. But this long run is a misleading guide to current affairs. In the long run we are all dead. Economists set themselves too easy, too useless a task if in tempestuous seasons they can only tell us that when the storm is long past the ocean will be flat again.

In actual experience, a change in n is liable to have a reaction both on k and k and on r. It will be enough to give a few typical instances. Before the war (and indeed since) there was a considerable element of what was conventional and arbitrary in the reserve policy of the banks, but especially in the policy of the State Banks towards their gold reserves. These reserves were kept for show rather than for use, and their amount was not the result of close reasoning. There was a decided tendency on the part of these banks between 1900 and 1914 to bottle up gold when it flowed towards them and to part with it reluctantly when the tide was flowing the other way. Consequently, when gold became relatively abundant they tended to hoard what came their way and to raise the proportion of the reserves, with the result that the increased output of South African gold was absorbed with less effect on the price level than would have been the case if an increase of n had been totally without reaction on the value of r.

...Thus in these and other ways the terms of our equation tend in their movements to favor the stability of p, and there is a certain friction which prevents a moderate change in n from exercising its full proportionate effect on p.  On the other hand, a large change in n, which rubs away the initial frictions, and especially a change in n due to causes which set up a general expectation of a further change in the same direction, may produce a more than proportionate effect on p.}}

Keynes thus accepts the Quantity Theory as accurate over the long-term but not over the short term. Keynes remarks that contrary to contemporaneous thinking, velocity and output were not stable but highly variable and as such, the quantity of money was of little importance in driving prices.

The theory was influentially restated by Milton Friedman in response to the work of John Maynard Keynes and Keynesianism.  Friedman understood that Keynes was like Friedman, a "quantity theorist" and that Keynes Revolution "was from, as it were, within the governing body", i.e. consistent with previous Quantity Theory.  Friedman notes the similarities between his views and those of Keynes when he wrote...

Friedman notes that Keynes shifted the focus away from the quantity of money (Fisher's M and Keynes' n) and put the focus on price and output.  Friedman writes...

The Monetarist counter-position was that contrary to Keynes, velocity was not a passive function of the quantity of money but it can be an independent variable.  Friedman wrote:

Thus while Marx, Keynes, and Friedman all accepted the Quantity Theory, they each placed different emphasis as to which variable was the driver in changing prices.  Marx emphasized production, Keynes income and demand, and Friedman the quantity of money.

Academic discussion remains over the degree to which different figures developed the theory.  For instance, Bieda argues that Copernicus's observation

amounts to a statement of the theory, while other economic historians date the discovery later, to figures such as Jean Bodin, David Hume, and John Stuart Mill.

The quantity theory of money preserved its importance even in the decades after Friedmanian monetarism had occurred. In new classical macroeconomics the quantity theory of money was still a doctrine of fundamental importance, but Robert E. Lucas and other leading new classical economists made serious efforts to specify and refine its theoretical meaning. For new classical economists, following David Hume's famous essay "Of Money", money was not neutral in the short-run, so the quantity theory was assumed to hold only in the long-run. These theoretical considerations involved serious changes as to the scope of countercyclical economic policy.

Historically, the main rival of the quantity theory was the real bills doctrine, which says that the issue of money does not raise prices, as long as the new money is issued in exchange for assets of sufficient value.

 Fisher's equation of exchange 
In its modern form, the quantity theory builds upon the following definitional relationship.

where
 is the total amount of money in circulation on average in an economy during the period, say a year.
 is the transactions velocity of money, that is the average frequency across all transactions with which a unit of money is spent. This reflects availability of financial institutions, economic variables, and choices made as to how fast people turn over their money.

Mainstream economics accepts a simplification, the equation of exchange:

where
 is the price level associated with transactions for the economy during the period
 is an index of the real value of aggregate transactions.

The previous equation presents the difficulty that the associated data are not available for all transactions. With the development of national income and product accounts, emphasis shifted to national-income or final-product transactions, rather than gross transactions.   Economists may therefore work 
where
 is the velocity of money in final expenditures.
 is an index of the real value of final expenditures.

As an example,  might represent currency plus deposits in checking and savings accounts held by the public,  real output (which equals real expenditure in macroeconomic equilibrium) with  the corresponding price level, and  the nominal (money) value of output. In one empirical formulation, velocity was taken to be "the ratio of net national product in current prices to the money stock".

Thus far, the theory is not particularly controversial, as the equation of exchange is an identity. A theory requires that assumptions be made about the causal relationships among the four variables in this one equation. There are debates about the extent to which each of these variables is dependent upon the others. The quantity theory postulates that the primary causal effect is an effect of M on P.

Cambridge approach

Economists  Alfred Marshall, A.C. Pigou, and John Maynard Keynes (before he developed his own, eponymous school of thought) associated with Cambridge University, took a slightly different approach to the quantity theory, focusing on money demand instead of money supply.  They argued that a certain portion of the money supply will not be used for transactions; instead, it will be held for the convenience and security of having cash on hand.  This portion of cash is commonly represented as k, a portion of nominal income. The Cambridge economists also thought wealth would play a role, but wealth is often omitted for simplicity.  The Cambridge equation is thus:

Assuming that the economy is at equilibrium,  is exogenous, and k is fixed in the short run, the Cambridge equation is equivalent to the equation of exchange with velocity equal to the inverse of k:

The Cambridge version of the quantity theory led to both Keynes's attack on the quantity theory and the Monetarist revival of the theory.

Monge (2021)  showed that the Cambridge equation comes from a Cobb-Douglas utility function, which demonstrates that, in classical quantity theory, money has diminishing marginal utility (then, inflation is a monetary phenomenon).

Evidence
As restated by Milton Friedman, the quantity theory emphasizes the following relationship of the nominal value of expenditures  and the price level  to the quantity of money :

The plus signs indicate that a change in the money supply is hypothesized to change nominal expenditures and the price level in the same direction (for other variables held constant).

Friedman described the empirical regularity of substantial changes in the quantity of money and in the level of prices as perhaps the most-evidenced economic phenomenon on record.
Empirical studies have found relations consistent with the models above and with causation running from money to prices. The short-run relation of a change in the money supply in the past has been relatively more associated with a change in real output  than the price level  in (1) but with much variation in the precision, timing, and size of the relation.

Friedman also developed the "Money Multiplier", which demonstrated how much a change in the reserve ratio of banks would change the money supply. In the formula,  represents the reserve ratio, while  represents the money multiplier.

Principles
The theory above is based on the following hypotheses:

 The source of inflation is fundamentally derived from the growth rate of the money supply.
 The supply of money is exogenous.
 The demand for money, as reflected in its velocity, is a stable function of nominal income, interest rates, and so forth.
 The mechanism for injecting money into the economy is not that important in the long run.
 The real interest rate is determined by non-monetary factors: (productivity of capital, time preference).

Decline of money-supply targeting
An application of the quantity-theory approach aimed at removing monetary policy as a source of macroeconomic instability was to target a constant, low growth rate of the money supply.   Still, practical identification of the relevant money supply, including measurement, was always somewhat controversial and difficult. As financial intermediation grew in complexity and sophistication in the 1980s and 1990s, it became more so. To mitigate this problem, some central banks, including the U.S. Federal Reserve, which had targeted the money supply, reverted to targeting interest rates. Starting 1990 with New Zealand, more and more central banks started to communicate inflation targets as the primary guidance for the public. Reasons were that interest targeting turned out to be a less effective tool in low-interest phases and it did not cope with the public uncertainty about future inflation rates to expect. The communication of inflation targets helps to anchor the public inflation expectations, it makes central banks more accountable for their actions, and it reduces economic uncertainty among the participants in the economy. But monetary aggregates remain a leading economic indicator. with "some evidence that the linkages between money and economic activity are robust even at relatively short-run frequencies."

Criticisms
Knut Wicksell criticized the quantity theory of money, citing the notion of a "pure credit economy".

John Maynard Keynes criticized the quantity theory of money in his book The General Theory of Employment, Interest and Money. Keynes had originally been a proponent of the theory, but he presented an alternative in the General Theory. Keynes argued that the price level was not strictly determined by the money supply. Changes in the money supply could have effects on real variables like output.

Ludwig von Mises agreed that there was a core of truth in the quantity theory, but criticized its focus on the supply of money without adequately explaining the demand for money. He said the theory "fails to explain the mechanism of variations in the value of money".

In his book The Denationalisation of Money, Friedrich Hayek described the quantity theory of money "as no more than a useful rough approximation to a really adequate explanation". According to him, the theory "becomes wholly useless where several concurrent distinct kinds of money are simultaneously in use in the same territory."

See also

 Classical dichotomy
 Credit theory of money
 Cumulative process
 Demand for money
 Equation of exchange
 Guanzi (text)
 Income velocity of money
 Liquidity preference
 Metallism
 Bimetallism
 Modern Monetary Theory
 "Monetae cudendae ratio"
 Monetarism
 Monetary inflation
 Monetary policy
 Neutrality of money

Alternative theories
 Benjamin Anderson (a critic of mainstream variant)
 Fiscal theory of the price level
 Real bills doctrine

 References 

Further reading
 Fisher Irving, The Purchasing Power of Money, 1911 (PDF, Duke University) 
 Friedman, Milton  (1987 [2008]). "quantity theory of money", The New Palgrave: A Dictionary of Economics, v. 4, pp. 3–20. Abstract. Arrow-page searchable preview at John Eatwell et al.(1989), Money: The New Palgrave, pp. 1–40.
 
 Humphrey, Thomas M.(1974). The Quantity Theory of Money: Its Historical Evolution and Role in Policy Debates. FRB Richmond Economic Review, Vol. 60, May/June 1974, pp. 2–19. Available at [SSRN: http://ssrn.com/abstract=2117542]
 Laidler, David E.W. (1991). The Golden Age of the Quantity Theory: The Development of Neoclassical Monetary Economics, 1870–1914. Princeton UP. Description and review.
 
 
 Mises, Ludwig Heinrich Edler von; Human Action: A Treatise on Economics (1949), Ch. XVII "Indirect Exchange", §4. "The Determination of the Purchasing Power of Money".
Friedman, Schwartz, 1963, A Monetary History of the United States''

External links

 The Quantity Theory of Money from John Stuart Mill through Irving Fisher from the New School
 "Quantity theory of money" at Formularium.org – calculate M, V, P and Q with your own values to understand the equation
 How to Cure Inflation (from a Quantity Theory of Money perspective) from Aplia Econ Blog

Monetary economics
Business cycle theories